Antonionian (born Jordan Dalrymple) is a multi-instrumentalist based in California.

History
Jordan Dalrymple has been a member of Subtle and 13 & God.

He released the debut album, Antonionian, under the alias Antonionian on Anticon in 2011.

Discography

Redacted Choir
 Redacted Choir (2021)

Antonionian
 Antonionian (2011)
 The War EP (2012)
 Versions EP (2013)
 Extremes EP (2014)
 Arrhythmia (2019)

Subtle
 A New White (2004)
 For Hero: For Fool (2006)
 ExitingARM (2008)

13 & God
 Own Your Ghost (2011)

Contributions
 Clouddead - "Mulholland Instrumental" from "Dead Dogs Two" (2004)
 Doseone - "The Tale of the Private Mind" from Ha (2005)
 Themselves - "Daxstrong" from CrownsDown (2009)

References

Anticon artists
American multi-instrumentalists
Musicians from the San Francisco Bay Area